Motorola One (stylised as MotorolaOne) is a series of Android phones developed by Motorola Mobility. The Motorola One series, first launched in 2018 as upper mid-range replacements for the Moto X4, was originally a series of phones featuring the Android One version of Android and mostly made available in Asian and European markets. However, the latest Motorola One series phones like Motorola One Zoom does not support Android One.

Releases

Motorola One 
The first release in the series is named the Motorola One, however it did carry the alternative name of P30 Play in areas of Asia. It was released in October 2018 with Android Oreo. It came to the market at a price of 180 Euros, making it a low-end phone.

Motorola One Power 
The second release in this series is named the Motorola One Power, also called the P30 Note in China. It was released in October 2018 and boasted a 5000 mAh battery. It came to the market at a price of 250 Euros, making it a mid-range phone.

Motorola One Vision 
The third release in this series is named the Motorola One Vision. It was released on June 20, 2019 and boasted a 21:9 screen and a 48 MP main sensor, as well as Android Pie. It came to the market at a price of 300 Euros, making it a mid-range phone. This was Motorola's first phone to feature Samsung Exynos processors.

Motorola One Action 
The fourth release in this series is named the Motorola One Action. It was released on October 31, 2019 and was the first phone in the market to record landscape video footage when held in the portrait position enabled by an ultrawide camera. It came to the market at a price of 300 Euros, making it a mid-range phone. Like the Motorola One Vision, it features the Samsung Exynos 9609 chipset. The US version of this phone is not supported by the Android One program.

Motorola One Zoom
The fifth release in the series is named the Motorola One Zoom. It was released on September 5, 2019 with a quad camera setup including telephoto and ultrawide lenses and a 48 MP main sensor. It came to the market at a price of 400 Euros, making it a mid-range phone and the most expensive in the series.

Motorola One Macro
The sixth release in the series is named the Motorola One Macro. It was released on October 12, 2019 with a dedicated macro camera. It costs 130 Euros, making it a low-end phone and cheaper than the original device.

Motorola One Hyper
The seventh release in the series is named the Motorola One Hyper. It was released on December 4, 2019 with a pop-up selfie camera, 45W fast charging, a 64 MP main sensor and Android 10. It costs 360 Euros, making it a mid-range phone and the second most expensive in the series.

Motorola One Fusion
The eighth release in the series is named the Motorola One Fusion. It was released on July 2, 2020 with a 5000 mAh battery and a 48 MP quad camera setup. It costs 200 Euros, making it a mid-range phone.

Motorola One Fusion+
The ninth release in the series is named the Motorola One Fusion+. It was released on June 8, 2020 with a pop-up selfie camera, a 5000 mAh battery and a 64 MP quad camera setup. It costs 300 Euros, making it a mid-range phone.

Specifications

References

Motorola mobile phones
Android (operating system)
Mobile phones introduced in 2018